The Ford Model B is an upscale touring car (with polished wood and brass trim) that was introduced in 1904 by Ford. It was built at the Ford Piquette Avenue Plant.  It was Ford's first car to use the front-engine layout, with a large 24 hp 4-cylinder engine positioned at the front behind a conventional radiator. The smaller Model A-derived Model C positioned its flat 2-cylinder motor under the seat.

Priced at $2000 (equivalent to $ today), the Model B was a high-end car. Produced for three years, sales were predictably slower than the Model C, which was priced at one-third of the cost. The Model B was replaced by the derivative Model K in 1906.

References

Further reading

See also
Ford Model B (1932)

Model B
Cars introduced in 1904
1900s cars
Veteran vehicles
Motor vehicles manufactured in the United States